The Airdale Backcountry is an American amateur-built aircraft that was designed by Brett McKinney and based upon John Larsen's Avid Mk IV design. It was produced by Airdale Flyer Company, of Rhinelander, Wisconsin, but the company went out of business in 2017 and production ended. When it was available the aircraft was supplied as a kit for amateur construction.

Design and development
The Backcountry features a strut-braced high-wing, a two-seats-in-side-by-side configuration enclosed cockpit with doors for access, fixed conventional landing gear and a single engine in tractor configuration.

The aircraft fuselage is made from welded 4130 steel tubing, while the wing is of aluminum construction, with all surfaces covered in doped aircraft fabric. The Backcountry was designed to use the  Stratus EA 81 automotive conversion four-stroke powerplant.

The company also offered a conversion kit for existing Mk IVs.

Specifications (Backcountry)

References

External links

Airdale aircraft
Homebuilt aircraft
Single-engined tractor aircraft